Sir Harry Campion, KCB, CBE (20 May 1905 – 24 May 1996) was a British statistician and the first director of what was the Central Statistical Office of the United Kingdom. He was also first director of the United Nations Statistical Office. He played a leading role in the development of official statistics, nationally and internationally, after the Second World War.

Background and early career

Harry Campion (later Sir Harry Campion) was born in Worsley, Lancashire, and was educated at Farnworth Grammar School and Manchester University. After leaving university, Campion joined the newly formed Cotton Trade Statistical Bureau, which collected data on output and sales of the cotton industry in the UK and also data on cotton industries of other countries and principal export markets and where he took part in the preparation of a regular digest of statistics. He spent 1932 in the United States, having been awarded a Rockefeller Foundation scholarship, then returned to Manchester University where he became Robert Ottley Reader in Statistics from 1933 to 1939 and set up an Economic Research Section carrying out applied research. While at Manchester he published research on the distribution of national capital using estate duty data and a book on public and private property. In 1939, Mr Campion joined the Central Economic Intelligence Service (CEIS), part of the War Cabinet Office, whose purpose was to provide economic and statistical material for a continuous survey of financial and economic plans and where Campion's role was to organise the statistics needed.

Career at the Central Statistical Office

In January 1941, the Central Statistical Office was established to co-ordinate all statistics brought before the War Cabinet and soon after, Campion became its first director. The CSO became established as a permanent feature of government focusing on the development of national income accounts. After the war, Campion was seconded to the United Nations for a year to organise the creation of the United Nations Statistical Office. Following this secondment, Campion returned to the CSO until his retirement in March 1967.

Some of the statistical products which first saw the light of day in the Harry Campion era are:

Monthly Digest of Statistics, first published in 1946.
Statistics of Trade Act 1947.
Standard Industrial Classification, completed in 1947 and introduced in 1948.
Annual Abstract, first post-war publication at beginning of 1948.
Index of Industrial Production, first published in February 1948.
Economic Trends, appeared in November 1953.
Development of the National accounts including:
Employment Policy White Paper, first published in 1946.
National Income and Expenditure Blue Book, first produced in September 1952.
Sources and Methods, first edition published in 1956.
quarterly estimates of national expenditure, first published in 1957.
constant price estimates, appeared in 1959.
seasonally adjusted estimates, appeared in 1960.
quarterly balance of payments estimates and the Balance of Payments Pink Book, first published in 1960.
Financial Statistics, first appeared in 1962.

United Nations

After the Second World War, the United Nations Economic and Social Council (ECOSOC) invited a number of prominent national statisticians, including Harry Campion, to form a 'Nuclear' Statistical Commission, which met from 1–14 May 1946 and made recommendations for the composition and terms of a permanent commission on statistics; the organisation of a statistical organisation; the disposition of existing statistical activities conducted by the League of Nations; the relationship between the statistical activities of the UN and specialised agencies; and the relationship between the statistical activities of the UN and other non-governmental organisations.  Shortly afterward, Campion was seconded, at the request of the first Secretary General of the United Nations, Mr Trygve Lie, to the UN for a year to organise the creation of the United Nations Statistical Office.

Death and bequests

Sir Harry Campion died in 1996 aged 91.

On his death, Sir Harry Campion bequeathed half the residue of his estate to the Royal Statistical Society, who decided to commemorate him and the prominent part he played in the development of official statistics through a Fellowship. The Campion Fellowship ia awarded every two years with the maximum sum of money available on any occasion being £10,000, to Fellows of the Society to promote a specific piece of work or project that would make a significant contribution to the development, use or exposition of statistics on the economic or social well being of the population.

The Manchester Statistical Society was also a beneficiary of the estate of Sir Harry Campion and similarly the bequest was placed into a trust fund to provide occasional modest grants to support research consistent with the Society's objective and history.

Posts held

Director, Central Statistical Office, UK, 1941–1967.
Member of the 'Nuclear' United Nations Statistics Commission, 1–15 May 1946.
Director, United Nations Statistical Office, 1946–1947
Chairman, United Nations Statistics Commission, 1951 & 1953.
President, Royal Statistical Society, 1957–1959.
President, International Statistical Institute, 1963–1967.
Vice-President, Manchester Statistical Society.

Awards

CBE (1945).
CB (1949).
RSS Guy Medal in Silver (1950).
KCB (1957).
Fellow of the American Statistical Association (1961)
Honorary LLB, Manchester (1967).

References

Further reading

Ward, R & Doggett, T. (1991). Keeping Score: The First Fifty Years of the Central Statistical Office. London: HMSO.
Obituary: Sir Harry Campion, 1905–96, W. Rudoe, Journal of the Royal Statistical Society. Series A (Statistics in Society), Vol. 160, No. 1 (1997), pp. 148–151

External links
Report to the Economic and Social Council of the United Nations on the first session of the Statistics Commission held from 27 January to 7 February 1947, paragraph 7, page 4.
United Nations Statistics Division
"Monthly Digest of Statistics", ONS. Retrieved 15 June 2006.
"Statistics of Trade Act 1947", (as amended), ONS library service. Retrieved 15 June 2007.
"Introduction to UK Standard Industrial Classification of Economic Activities UK SIC(92)", ONS. Retrieved 15 June 2007.
"Annual Abstract of Statistics", ONS. Retrieved 15 June 2007.
"Index of Production – UK", ONS. Retrieved 15 June 2007.
"Economic Trends", ONS. Retrieved 15 June 2007.
"United Kingdom National Accounts – The Blue Book", ONS. Retrieved 15 June 2007.
"United Kingdom Balance of Payments – The Pink Book", ONS. Retrieved 15 June 2007.
"Financial Statistics", ONS. Retrieved 15 June 2007.

1905 births
1996 deaths
People from Worsley
English civil servants
English statisticians
Knights Commander of the Order of the Bath
Alumni of the University of Manchester
Directors of the Central Statistical Office (United Kingdom)
Civil servants in the Cabinet Office
Fellows of the American Statistical Association
Presidents of the Royal Statistical Society
Presidents of the International Statistical Institute
People educated at Farnworth Grammar School
20th-century English mathematicians